USS LST-274 was a  in the United States Navy during World War II.

Construction and career 
LST-274 was laid down on 11 March 1943 at American Bridge Co., Seneca, Indiana. Launched on 15 August 1943 and commissioned on 28 September 1943.

She was present during the West Loch disaster and she was moored with LST-69, LST-225, LST-205, LST-43, LST-179, LST-353, and LST-39. No crew members were lost aboard the ship during that disaster.

During World War II, LST-274 was assigned to the Asiatic-Pacific theater. She took part in the Occupation of Kwajalein and Majuro Atolls, 31 January to 8 February 1944 and Battle of Saipan from 17 June to 3 July 1944.

LST-274 was decommissioned on 6 May 1946 and struck from the Navy Register on 23 June 1947.

On 29 June 1948, she was sold for scrap to Alexander Shipyard, Inc., New Orleans, Louisiana.

Awards 
LST-274 have earned the following awards:

American Campaign Medal
Asiatic-Pacific Campaign Medal (2 battle stars)
World War II Victory Medal

Citations

Sources 
 
 
 
 

World War II amphibious warfare vessels of the United States
Ships built in Ambridge, Pennsylvania
1943 ships
LST-1-class tank landing ships of the United States Navy